Kānhapā, Kanha or Kanhapada or Krishnacharya ( c 10th century AD) was one of the main poets of Charyapada, the earliest known example of Assamese, Bengali, Maithili and Odia literature. He was a tantric Buddhist and a disciplle of Jalandhar. Kanhapada is also a prominent siddhacharya to Nath Sampradaya after Matsyendranatha and Gorakhnath. His poems in Charjyapad are written in a code, whereby every poem has a descriptive or narrative surface meaning but also encodes tantric Buddhist teachings. Some experts believe this was to conceal sacred knowledge from the uninitiated, while others hold that it was to avoid religious persecution.

In one of his poems, Kanhupa wrote:

The language of Kanhupa's poetry bears a very strong resemblance to modern Bangla, Assamese and Odia. For example,

Padama (Padma:Lotus), Chausatthi (64), Pakhudi (petals) Tahin (there, in that), Charhi (climb/rise), nachai (dances), Dombi (a Bengali or Odia woman belonging to the scheduled caste, Domi/Domni), Bapuri (a Bangla and Odia word for 'poor fellow'; ‘বাপুর, বাপুড়া’)

Somewhat modern poetic Bangla would be, “একশো পদ্মে/পদমে চৌষট্টি পাকড়ি/পাখুড়ি। তাহে চড়িয়া/চড়ি নাচে ডোমি বাপুড়ি/বেচারি॥”

or

The above verse hardly requires any translation to be understood in present-day Bangla or Odia.

Modern poetic Bengali version of it will be “হ্যাঁ লো ডোমনি/ডোমি, তোকে/তোয় পুঁছি/জিজ্ঞাসি/শুধাই সদ্ভাবে। আসিস-যাস ডোমি/ডোমনি কাহার নায়/নাওয়ে”.

References

Bengali male poets
Indian Buddhists
Mahasiddhas
Buddhist yogis
Indian male poets
Vajrayana